B-CAS (BS Conditional Access Systems Co., Ltd.) is a vendor and operator of the ISDB CAS system in Japan, largely owned by the public broadcaster NHK with some other electronics companies and broadcasters airing in BSAT. It also refers to the reception method (B-CAS method) that this company offers. 

All ISDB receiving apparatus such as DTT TV, tuner, and DVD recorder except 1seg-only devices require a B-CAS card under regulation and B-CAS cards are supplied with most units at purchase. B-CAS cards cannot be purchased separately.

Implementations of ISDB-T and ISDB-T International (SBTVD) outside Japan do not use the B-CAS system at all as they do not employ the Copy-Once encryption method used on ISDB broadcasts in Japan. For these countries, some operators may choose to implement their own copy protection system.

Gallery

See also
Integrated Services Digital Broadcasting

External links

 Company website 

ISDB
Technology companies of Japan
NHK